She Knew What She Wanted is a 1936 British musical comedy film directed by Thomas Bentley and starring Albert Burdon, Claude Dampier and Googie Withers. It was based on the stage musical Funny Face.

Premise
An amoral young dancer falls in love with the band leader.

Cast
 Albert Burdon as Dugsie 
 Betty Ann Davies as Frankie 
 Claude Dampier as Jimmy Reeves 
 W.H. Berry as Herbert 
 Fred Conyngham as Peter Thurston 
 Ben Welden as Chester 
 Googie Withers as Dora 
 Hope Davy as June 
 Sybil Grove as Mme. Piccard 
 Albert le Fre as Butler

References

External links

1936 films
1930s English-language films
British musical comedy films
1936 musical comedy films
Films directed by Thomas Bentley
British black-and-white films
Films shot at British International Pictures Studios
1930s British films